The twentieth series of the British medical drama television series Casualty aired on BBC One from 10 September 2005 to 26 August 2006. The series ran for 48 episodes, including two multi-episode crossovers with Holby City, broadcast as Casualty@Holby City.

Cast

Main characters 

Luke Bailey as Sam Bateman
Ian Bleasdale as Josh Griffiths
Mark Bonnar as Bruno Jenkins (episodes 1−25)
Georgina Bouzova as Ellen Zitek
Liz Carling as Selena Donovan
Susan Cookson as Maggie Coldwell
Elyes Gabel as Guppy Sandhu
Kip Gamblin as Greg Fallon (from episode 41)
Rebekah Gibbs as Nina Farr
Sam Grey as Alice Chantrey (from episode 32)
Martina Laird as Comfort Jones
Simon MacCorkindale as Harry Harper
Janine Mellor as Kelsey Phillips
Suzanne Packer as Tess Bateman
Ben Price as Nathan Spencer (from episode 16)
James Redmond as John "Abs" Denham
Derek Thompson as Charlie Fairhead
Will Thorp as Woody Joyner (until episode 18)
Matthew Wait as Luke Warren (until episode 39)

Episode 18 is part of a two-part crossover with Holby City and features the following Holby City regulars:
Hugh Quarshie as Ric Griffin
Amanda Mealing as Connie Beauchamp
Kelly Adams as Mickie Hendrie
Jaye Jacobs as Donna Jackson
Sharon D. Clarke as Lola Griffin

Recurring and guest characters 

Joanne Adams as Sergeant Edie Lennox (episode 28)
Nick Bagnall as Lee Cull (episodes 11−15)
Elizabeth Bell as Peggy Spencer (episodes 22−23)
Katie Blake as Susan Haddon (episodes 3−11)
Jack Dedman as Louis Fairhead (episodes 18−35)
Laura Donnelly as Fleur Butler (until episode 7)
J.S. Duffy as Si Bradwell (episode 6−7)
Louis Emerick as Mike Bateman (episode 47)
Ricky Fearon as Amadou Ghedi (episodes 34 and 38)
David Firth as Richard Bardon (episode 48)
Michael French as Nick Jordan (episode 18)
Nicole Hall as PC Carys Williams (episodes 12 and 23)
Alex Hardy as Warren Alpin (episodes 21 and 25)
Julia Hills as Caroline Joyner (episode 18)
Thomas Hudson as Jamie Coldwell (episodes 1−36)
Thomas Law as Matt Haddon (episodes 3−14)
Gary Mavers as Will Manning (episodes 4−5)
Lynsey McCaffrey as Sarah Austen (episodes 5−7)
Alex McQueen as Dr Keith Greene(episode 40)
Paul M Merson as DC Chase (episodes 13 and 16)
David Michaels as Jeremy Sadler (episode 16)
Tony Mooney as Steve Coldwell (episodes 1−35)
Arnold Oceng as Soloman Lukah (episodes 34−39)
Jane Riley as Joanne Coldwell (episodes 1−36)
Daniel Roberts as John Morecombe (episodes 37 and 40)
Madhav Sharma as Jas Sandhu (episodes 3−21)
Peter Silverleaf as Colin Evans (episode 15)
Kamal Sylvester as PC Sagar (episode 22)
Maryann Turner as Mary Alpin (episodes 21 and 25)
Colin Wells as DI Jackson (episode 39)

Episodes

Notes

References

External links
 Casualty series 20 at the Internet Movie Database

20
2005 British television seasons
2006 British television seasons